Albert Wray Denson (born May 13, 1960, in Starkville, Mississippi), more commonly known as Al Denson, is a contemporary Christian music artist and a Christian radio and television show host.

Biography
Denson first became well known for his involvement with contemporary Christian music.  As of 2005, he has written 19 songs that reached the top 10 on Christian radio charts nationwide.  He has seven songs that reached the No. 1 position on the Christian radio charts: "Peace Be Still", "Shine Out the Light", "To Forgive", "Be the One", "Take Me to the Cross", "Be", and "Come and Fill This Place".  In addition, he has been nominated for five Dove Awards, and he won Song of the Year.  He has been a featured performer for Billy Graham's and Franklin Graham's crusades and Dawson McAllister Ministries, and was a frequent guest on Fire By Nite.

Denson also hosts a weekly television show called The Al Denson Show, which is aired on TBN, Daystar, and INSP, as well as among the 36 channels on the Sky Angel nationwide direct-to-home satellite TV service.  He has since also started a program called The Parent Factor, a radio show geared towards parents.

In addition, Denson developed a line of curriculum for school children in the United States, which teaches character education and emphasizes instilling good character qualities in children.

As of 2019, Denson served as Liberty University's commercial music industry liaison.

Denson resides just outside Dallas, Texas.

Discography
1985: Stand Up 
1988: The Battle is On 
1989: Al Denson 
1990: Be the One 
1992: The Extra Mile 
1993: Reasons 
1995: Do You Know This Man?
1997: Take Me to the Cross 
1998: Reunion Praise 
1998: Tabula Rasa 
2000: From This Day On 
2000: Awakening the Heart of Worship 
2003: With One Voice 
2005: Amazing Love

Videography
1990: Be The One 
1992: The Extra Mile 
1992: To Forgive
1994: Alcatraz 
1994: The Door 
1994: I Know A Love 
1994: Reasons 
1994: INSP Live Television Special (INSP exclusive)
1997: "Take Me to the Cross" 
2000: An Evening of Praise with Al Denson

References

External links
 

1960 births
Living people
American male singers
American performers of Christian music
People from Starkville, Mississippi
Musicians from Dallas
American television talk show hosts